Lepiota hystrix is a species of fungus belonging to the family Agaricaceae.

It is native to Northern Europe and Japan.

References

hystrix